The Swastika Outside Germany is a book by Donald M. McKale.  It is a history of the Nationalsozialistische Deutsche Arbeiter-Partei Auslands-Organisation (NSDAP/AO, National Socialist German Workers' Party Foreign Organization), an institution created by Nazi Germany as a network of Nazi groups outside Germany.

It was published in 1977 by Kent State University Press as a 288-page hardcover.

External links
The Swastika Outside Germany reviewed by Peter W. Becker in American Historical Review, Vol. 83, No. 5 (Dec., 1978), pp. 1288–1289.

1977 non-fiction books
20th-century history books
History books about Nazism
Kent State University Press books